Louisiana's 3rd State Senate district is one of 39 districts in the Louisiana State Senate. It has been represented by Democrat Joseph Bouie Jr. since 2020, succeeding fellow Democrat Jean-Paul Morrell.

Geography
District 3 covers some of eastern New Orleans (primarily Gentilly, West Lake Forest, and the Lower Ninth Ward), as well as smaller parts of St. Bernard and Jefferson Parishes, including some or all of Chalmette, Arabi, Harvey, and Marrero.

The district overlaps with Louisiana's 1st and 2nd congressional districts, and with the 83rd, 84th, 85th, 87th, 93rd, 97th, 99th, 100th, 102nd, and 103rd districts of the Louisiana House of Representatives.

Recent election results
Louisiana uses a jungle primary system. If no candidate receives 50% in the first round of voting, when all candidates appear on the same ballot regardless of party, the top-two finishers advance to a runoff election.

2019

2015

2011
Following redistricting, District 3 incumbent Jean-Paul Morrell was drawn into the same district as District 2 incumbent Cynthia Willard-Lewis.

Federal and statewide results in District 3

References

Louisiana State Senate districts
Jefferson Parish, Louisiana
Orleans Parish, Louisiana
St. Bernard Parish, Louisiana